= Lraber =

Armenian-language newspaper (1908-1909)

- Type: Weekly
- Editor: K. Khachaturian
- Founded: 1908
- Ceased publication: 1909
- Language: Armenian language
- Headquarters: Astrakhan

Lraber (Armenian: Լրաբեր, "Messenger") was an Armenian language weekly newspaper published in Astrakhan, Russian Empire 1908-1909. K. Khachaturian was the editor and publisher of the newspaper.
